Willis Beeler Bible Sr. (1890 — June 11, 1967) was an American football coach, athletic director, and professor. He served as the head football coach at Furman University from 1914 to 1915. Bible resigned as Furman's head football coach in mid-November 1915 and was succeeded by assistant coach Billy Laval for the final game of the season. Bible was a professor of English at East Tennessee State University for 40 years before retiring in 1961.

Bible earned a Bachelor of Arts degree in 1911 and a Master of Arts degree in 1916, both from Carson–Newman University. He was the brother of College Football Hall of Fame coach Dana X. Bible. Bible died at the age of 76, on June 11, 1967, at Memorial Hospital in Johnson City, Tennessee.

Head coaching record

Notes

References

1890 births
1967 deaths
Carson–Newman University alumni
East Tennessee State University faculty
Furman Paladins athletic directors
Furman Paladins football coaches